Thallarcha leptographa is a moth in the subfamily Arctiinae. It was described by Turner in 1899. It is found in Australia, where it has been recorded from New South Wales and Queensland.

References

Moths described in 1899
Lithosiini